René Salomon Olembé-Olembé (born 8 December 1980) is a Cameroonian former professional footballer who played as a left midfielder.

Club career
Olembé started his career with Nantes, where he contributed 30 appearances as his side won 2000–01 French Division 1. He also played in the victorious 1999 and 2000 Coupe de France finals and the 1999 Trophée des Champions. He then transferred to Marseille in 2002. While at Marseille he spent a season on loan at English Premiership strugglers Leeds United and a season at Qatari club Al Rayyan.

After leaving Marseille permanently in 2007, Olembé spent the summer on trial at Premiership newcomers Derby County, where he scored in a friendly match against Burton Albion. However, he was not offered a contract by Derby and, on 4 September, he was snapped up by Wigan Athletic manager Chris Hutchings on a one-year initial contract. He was signed as a replacement for the recently departed Leighton Baines, but only made eight appearances for the Lancashire club.

In April 2008, it was revealed that Olembé would transfer to Turkish club Kayserispor.

In January 2010, in the winter break of his second season in the Süper Lig, Olembé transferred to Greek side Larissa, but spent only a few months with the club before joining English Championship team Burnley on trial in March. He played in a reserve game against Manchester City but was substituted at half-time.

International career
Olembé made his debut for the Cameroon national team in 1997, and made a total of 64 appearances for his country. He represented Cameroon at the 1998 FIFA World Cup and the 2004 African Cup of Nations.

Career statistics
Cameroon score shown first

Honours
Marseille
UEFA Intertoto Cup: 2005

References

External links
 
 BBC: World Cup 2002
 
 

1980 births
Living people
Footballers from Yaoundé
Association football midfielders
Cameroonian footballers
Cameroon international footballers
FC Nantes players
Olympique de Marseille players
Leeds United F.C. players
Wigan Athletic F.C. players
Kayserispor footballers
Athlitiki Enosi Larissa F.C. players
Al-Rayyan SC players
Ligue 1 players
Premier League players
Süper Lig players
Qatar Stars League players
1998 FIFA World Cup players
2001 FIFA Confederations Cup players
2002 FIFA World Cup players
1998 African Cup of Nations players
2000 African Cup of Nations players
2002 African Cup of Nations players
2004 African Cup of Nations players
2006 Africa Cup of Nations players
Expatriate footballers in France
Expatriate footballers in Turkey
Expatriate footballers in Greece
Expatriate footballers in England
Expatriate footballers in Qatar
Cameroonian expatriate footballers
Cameroonian expatriate sportspeople in England
Cameroonian expatriate sportspeople in Turkey
Cameroonian expatriate sportspeople in Greece
Cameroonian expatriate sportspeople in France
Cameroonian expatriate sportspeople in Qatar